Sir Frederick  Whitley-Thomson (2 September 1851 – 21 June 1925) was a British Liberal Party politician and businessman.

Background
He was the son of Jonathan Thomson, merchant of Glasgow, and Emma Whitley of Halifax. He was educated at Glasgow Academy and Andersonian University, Glasgow. He married Bertha Florence Smith of Halifax in 1888. They had one daughter, Doris, who married Lieutenant Commander Kenworthy, MP. In 1914, they received a grant by Royal Licensee to use the surname Whitley-Thomson.

Early career
He was the head of J. Whitley and Sons, card manufacturers of Brunswick Mills, Halifax and a Director of the English Card-clothing Company, Ltd. He served as a Governor of Halifax Technical School. He was Vice-President of Halifax Liberal Association and a member of Halifax Chamber of Commerce.

Political career
He sat as Liberal MP for Skipton from 1900 to 1906. In 1900, standing for parliament for the first time, he surprisingly gained the seat from the Liberal Unionists.

He stood down at the general election of January 1906. In 1908, he stood as the Liberal candidate at the 1908 Ross by-election in Herefordshire. He was unable to hold this marginal Liberal seat. 

In 1908, he was appointed as an Alderman of Halifax Borough Council and served as the Mayor of Halifax from 1908 to 1911. He was a Justice of the Peace for Halifax. In January 1910, he stood as the Liberal candidate at Colchester. This was another Liberal seat, but again he failed to hold it.

Later life
After 1910, he did not stand for parliament again. He was instrumental in raising a fund of £10,000 for the Royal Halifax Infirmary and Halifax District Nursing Association in memory of King Edward VII. 

In 1913, his daughter Doris married the Liberal MP, Joseph Kenworthy. 

He was president of the Halifax Chamber of Commerce from 1912 to 1914. He was chairman of the Finance Committee of Halifax Borough Council from 1913 to 1919. He was chairman of the Halifax War Refugees Committee, and received from King Albert I of Belgium the Medaille du Roi in recognition of services to Belgian refugees, resident in Halifax and district during the First World War.

He was knighted in the 1916 Birthday Honours.

References

1851 births
1925 deaths
Liberal Party (UK) MPs for English constituencies
UK MPs 1900–1906
Knights Bachelor